Johann Valentin Rathgeber (3 April 1682 – 2 June 1750) was a German composer, organist and choirmaster of the Baroque Era.

Life
Rathgeber was born in Oberelsbach.  His father, an organist, gave him his first music lessons. At the beginning of the 18th century, he began studying at the University of Würzburg, initially studying rhetoric, mathematics and law; later he changed direction and continued his studies in theology.

His first position was as a teacher at the Julius Hospital in Würzburg. In 1707 he took up the post of chamber musician and servant of the abbot of the Banz Abbey, Kilian Düring. A short time later he joined the Benedictine Order, and in 1711 entered the priesthood. Thereafter, he was organist, choirmaster and preacher at the abbey.

Between 1729 and 1738 he went on a study trip. It is an open question whether he did that with permission from his abbot or not. Documented stops on this trip were Mainz, Bonn, Cologne, Trier, Stuttgart, Regensburg, Germany, Switzerland, Vienna and Styria. Compositions from this period were primarily dedicated to his respective hosts. In 1738 he returned to the abbey, where he then lived in seclusion for a while. A short time later, he was allowed to regain his former office. He lived in the Banz Abbey until his death there, at the age of 68, which was attributed to gout.

Work

Rathgeber was a very versatile and productive composer and was one of the most popular and respected composers in southern Germany. He composed both secular and sacred works, the majority of his output being sacred vocal works. He wrote several hundred works, mainly masses (43), hymns, arias, litanies, requiems, magnificats, offertories (164), Marian antiphons (44) and also instrumental concertos (24) and songs. His Augsburger Tafel-Confect, short for Ohren-vergnügendes und Gemüth-ergötzendes Tafel-Confect (Augsburg Table Confectionery, short for Table Confectionery, Pleasuring the Ears and Delightful to the Soul) is a collection of songs meant to be performed for dessert, whereas a Tafelmusik was performed during a main course. He published three editions of his work in 1733, 1737 and 1739, Johann Caspar Seyfert adding a fourth in 1746.

Worklist (selection)

 Augsburger Tafel-Confect
 Opus I Octava musica clavium octo musicarum in Missis octo musicalibus (mass compositions)
 Opus II (vespers)
 Opus III (masses)
 Opus IV (offertories with instrumental accompaniment)
 Opus V (antiphons for the church year)
 Opus VI (secular instrumental works)
 Opus VII (masses for the church year)
 Opus VIII (requiem and Libera)
 Opus IX Psalmodia vespertina (vespers cycle)
 Opus X (Latin and German arias)
 Opus XI (hymns)
 Opus XII (rural and town masses)
 Opus XIII (Miserere and Tantum ergo)
 Opus XIV (offertories cycle in 3 parts)
 Opus XV (offertories)
 Opus XVI (antiphons)
 Opus XVII (vesper cycle)
 Opus XVIII (litanies)
 Opus XIX (masses)
 Opus XX (offertories)

References

External links

Intern.-Valentin-Rathgeber-Society
Valentin Rathgeber (1682–1750): "Augsburgisches Tafel-Confect" musica-dei-donum.org

Recordings 
 Messe von Muri, Concerti. Capella Murensis, ensemble arcimboldo, Direction: Johannes Strobl / Thilo Hirsch. Audite, 2007.

Sources 
 Max Hellmuth: Der Barockkomponist Valentin Rathgeber. Phil. Diss., Erlangen 1943. 
 Otto Ursprung: Valentin Rathgeber. In: Handbuch der Musikwissenschaft. Band 2 – Die Katholische Kirchenmusik. Laaber Verlag Wiesbaden 1979. Kapitel 4, S. 228ff.  
 Elizabeth Roche: Rathgeber, Johann Valentin. In: The New Grove. Dictionary of Music and Musicians. Band 15. London 1980. .
 Alfred Baumgartner: Valentin Rathgeber. In: Der Große Musikführer. Band 2 – Barockmusik. Kiesel-Verlag 1981. S. 560.  
 Hans Kleiner, Erhard Nowak: Nur wer die Musik liebt. Valentin Rathgeber, Heimat, Herkunft, Leben und Werk. Verlag Dietrich Pfaehler, Neustadt an der Saale 1981, .
 Franz Krautwurst: Rathgeber, Johann Valentin. In: Die Musik in Geschichte und Gegenwart. Band 7. Kassel 1989. S. 19–22.
 
 Arnold Feil: Valentin Rathgeber. In: Metzler Musik Chronik. Stuttgart/Weimar 2005. S. 279f.
 Wilfried Dotzauer: Aspekte zur fränkischen Kirchenmusik des 18. Jahrhunderts im Bamberger Raum.  In: Ludger Stühlmeyer (Hg.) Stationen der Kirchenmusik im Erzbistum Bamberg. Bamberg 2007. S. 41–52.  

 Ludger Stühlmeyer: Johann Valentin Rathgeber. Ein Beitrag zur Wanderausstellung 2011. In: Heinrichsblatt, Katholische Wochenzeitung des Erzbistums Bamberg, No.32. Bamberg August 2011 und Katholische Sonntagszeitung für Deutschland. Köln August 2011.
 Ludger Stühlmeyer: Das Ohr am Puls der Zeit – der Klosterkomponist Johann Valentin Rathgeber. Fleißiger Kantorensohn mit spiraligem Studienweg. In: Musica sacra, 132. Jahrgang, Heft 2, Kassel 2012. S.  80–81.
 Ludger Stühlmeyer: Johann Valentin Rathgeber. Kantor, Komponist und Benediktiner. In: Jahrbuch des Erzbistums Bamberg, 91. Jahrgang 2016. Heinrichs-Verlag Bamberg, Juni 2015, .
 Barbara und Ludger Stühlmeyer: Johann Valentin Rathgeber. Leben und Werk. Verlag Sankt Michaelsbund, München 2016, .

1682 births
1750 deaths
German classical organists
German male organists
German Baroque composers
German Benedictines
18th-century keyboardists
18th-century classical composers
German male classical composers
People from Rhön-Grabfeld
18th-century German composers
18th-century German male musicians
Male classical organists